Beatrice Bürki (born 7 April 1965) is a Swiss diver. She competed in the women's 3 metre springboard event at the 1988 Summer Olympics.

References

External links
 

1965 births
Living people
Swiss female divers
Olympic divers of Switzerland
Divers at the 1988 Summer Olympics
Place of birth missing (living people)